Ansonia minuta is a species of toad in the family Bufonidae, described from the forests of Sarawak in 1960. It is known by a number of common names: tiny stream toad, dwarf slender toad, and minute slender toad. It is endemic to Borneo (both Indonesia and Malaysia) and occurs in tropical moist lowland forests. It is threatened by habitat loss.

Systematics
Recent phylogenetic studies found that A. minuta forms a sister relationship with another as yet undescribed member of Ansonia, and is positioned in a clade consisting of Ansonia hanitschi, Ansonia spinulifer, Ansonia platysoma, and the undescribed species.

Description

A. minuta is a smaller member of the genus Ansonia. The species is slender, with a wide truncate snout. Ear tympani are visible; the feet have rudimentary webbing. The skin on the back is tuberculate with rounded warts, while flanks and throat are more finely granulated. The male possesses a vocal sac with a longitudinal slit on the left side of the mouth.

Distribution and habitat
It has a terrestrial lifestyle and occurs in the lowland rainforests, where it breeds in small, rocky streams with clear flowing water. Larvae develop within streams.

Conservation
A. minuta is currently listed as Near Threatened by the IUCN, as it is believed to suffer from habitat loss through logging and the species will not inhabit disturbed habitats.

References

minuta
Endemic fauna of Borneo
Amphibians of Indonesia
Amphibians of Malaysia
Taxa named by Robert F. Inger
Amphibians described in 1960
Taxonomy articles created by Polbot
Amphibians of Borneo
Borneo lowland rain forests